Natalie Prass is the debut studio album by Natalie Prass. It was co-produced by Matthew E. White and Trey Pollard.

Composition, recording, and production
Prass began writing songs for her self-titled as early as 2009. In January 2012, Prass began to record with Matthew E. White, her childhood friend and founder of Spacebomb Records, in his studio attic in Richmond, Virginia. White provided the horn arrangements and Trey Pollard provided the string arrangements. Since the budget for the album was “virtually nonexistent,” White utilized the help of his friends from the Virginia Commonwealth University jazz program to record the strings. By February 2012, recording for the album was complete but the release was delayed due to Spacebomb’s inaugural release of Big Inner.

Music videos
The first music video for the album, "Why Don't You Believe In Me", was released on February 4, 2015. The music video, which was co-directed by Erica Prince and Tiona McClodden, features Prass "cutting up the features of her face and rearranging them in increasingly bizarre patterns".

A second music video from the album, "Bird of Prey", was released on June 15, 2015. The music video was directed by Malia James, bassist for the Dum Dum Girls.

Reception

Accolades

Track listing

Charts

References

2015 debut albums
Natalie Prass albums
Spacebomb Records albums